Gregory "Greg" Martin Garza (born August 16, 1991) is an American former professional soccer player who played as a left-back.

Club career

Estoril Praia
Garza spent several years with Sporting Clube de Portugal's under-19 team, but he was not offered a contract with the senior squad. As a result, he moved to Estoril Praia on a two-year contract in August 2010.

Club Tijuana
Garza signed with Mexican Primera División side Club Tijuana on December 21, 2011.
Garza made his debut coming in as a sub in minute 73 for José Sand against Monarcas Morelia in a 1–1 tied game. He scored the first goal of his career for the club on October 13, 2012 in a 2–2 draw at Santos Laguna.

Atlanta United

In December 2016 it was announced that Garza had signed a one-year loan deal with newly formed side Atlanta United for the 2017 season. Atlanta acquired Garza's MLS right from Columbus Crew SC in exchange for a second-round pick in the 2018 MLS SuperDraft.

On November 29, 2017, Atlanta announced that it had signed Garza to a permanent multi-year deal. Greg Garza made $175,008 for the 2018 MLS Season.

FC Cincinnati
On December 11, 2018, Atlanta United announced that the club had traded Garza to FC Cincinnati in exchange for $250,000 of Targeted Allocation Money (TAM) and $200,000 of General Allocation Money (GAM) to be used toward the acquisition of new players.

Retirement
On April 23, 2021, Garza announced his retirement from professional soccer at the age of 29. He cited his struggles with various injuries as the reason for his retirement. Since retirement, Garza maintains his connection with soccer through volunteering with local youth soccer clubs.  In 2021 Garza founded a soccer mentoring organization, Beyond Goals Mentoring along with former Atlanta United teammate Michael Parkhurst.

International career

Garza was announced as part of the United States senior squad for a friendly against the Czech Republic on September 3, 2014. His first senior international cap was recorded during the match, being subbed on in the 62nd minute. He was capped-tied to the U.S. national team after his first competitive match in the 2015 CONCACAF Gold Cup against Haiti, while starting and playing 67 minutes. But after the group stage he was traded out of the gold cup roster for DaMarcus Beasley as each team could make six changes if they advanced to the knockout round.

Personal life
Garza was born and raised in Texas but holds a Mexican passport by way of his father who was born in Mexico.

Career statistics

Honors
Tijuana
 Liga MX: Apertura 2012

Atlanta United
 MLS Cup: 2018
 MLS All-Star: 2017

References

External links
 
 

1991 births
Living people
Soccer players from Texas
Sportspeople from the Dallas–Fort Worth metroplex
Association football fullbacks
Association football defenders
Sporting CP footballers
American soccer players
American expatriate soccer players
American sportspeople of Mexican descent
G.D. Estoril Praia players
Club Tijuana footballers
Atlas F.C. footballers
Atlanta United FC players
Liga Portugal 2 players
Liga MX players
Major League Soccer players
Major League Soccer All-Stars
Expatriate footballers in Portugal
Expatriate footballers in Mexico
People from Grapevine, Texas
United States men's under-20 international soccer players
United States men's international soccer players
American expatriate sportspeople in Mexico
2015 CONCACAF Gold Cup players
FC Cincinnati players